Dale Tatum Mercer is an American socialite, interior designer, and television personality. She is known for her appearances, alongside her daughter Tinsley Mortimer, on the American reality television series High Society and The Real Housewives of New York City.

Biography 

Mercer, born Dale Tatum, is the daughter of William Louis Tatum and Otine Baird Tatum. Her family were members of the Country Club of Virginia and prominent in Richmond society. She grew up in Richmond and New York City. Mercer received a bachelor of arts degree from Meredith College and a Master of Liberal Arts degree from Harvard Extension School.

She married George Riley Mercer II, a businessman from Richmond. Her husband was a real estate developer, architectural consultant, and partner in the Mercer Rug and Carpet Company, the GII Corporation, and the George-Marshall Corporation. They have two daughters, Tinsley Randolph Mercer Mortimer and Dabney Winston Mercer. The family lived at Graymont, an early-20th-century mansion in central Richmond. She and Mercer later divorced after being married for 28 years. Her ex-husband died in 2015.

Mercer lives in Palm Beach, Florida and works as an interior designer there and in Manhattan.

Mercer was listed in the Social Register in 2006.

Mercer was a cast member of the 2010 reality television series High Society on The CW. In July 2010 Mercer appeared, alongside her daughter Tinsley, on the Dr. Phil episode Meddling Moms. Since 2017 Mercer has made appearances on Bravo's reality television series The Real Housewives of New York City.

References 

Living people
American socialites
American women interior designers
The Real Housewives cast members
People from Palm Beach, Florida
People from Richmond, Virginia
People from the Upper East Side
Mercer family of Virginia
Meredith College alumni
Harvard University alumni
Harvard Extension School alumni
Year of birth missing (living people)